Caloptilia callicirrha is a moth of the family Gracillariidae. It is known from Fiji, Guadalcanal and Rennell Island.

The larvae feed on Cajanus cajan. They mine the leaves of their host plant.

References

callicirrha
Moths described in 1924
Moths of Oceania